The canton of Évreux-3 is an administrative division of the Eure department, northern France. It was created at the French canton reorganisation which came into effect in March 2015. Its seat is in Évreux.

It consists of the following communes:

Angerville-la-Campagne
Les Baux-Sainte-Croix
Boncourt
Cierrey
Évreux (partly)
Fauville
Gauciel
Guichainville
Huest
Miserey
Le Plessis-Grohan
Saint-Luc
Sassey
La Trinité
Le Val-David
Le Vieil-Évreux

References

Cantons of Eure